Ute Plessmann is a German sprint canoer who competed in the late 1990s. She won a silver medal in the K-2 1000 m event at the 1998 ICF Canoe Sprint World Championships in Szeged.

References

German female canoeists
Living people
Year of birth missing (living people)
Place of birth missing (living people)
ICF Canoe Sprint World Championships medalists in kayak